The following television stations broadcast on digital channel 19 in Mexico:

 XERV-TDT in Reynosa, Tamaulipas
 XEWH-TDT in Hermosillo, Sonora
 XHATU-TDT in Atotonilco el Alto, Jalisco
 XHCDE-TDT in Ciudad Delicias, Chihuahua
 XHCEP-TDT in Celaya, Guanajuato
 XHCMO-TDT in Cuernavaca, Morelos
 XHCOL-TDT in Colima, Colima
 XHFAS-TDT in Fronteras, Sonora
 XHGVH-TDT in Guadalupe Victoria, Durango
 XHHHN-TDT in Huajuapan de León, Oaxaca
 XHIMS-TDT in Ímuris, Sonora
 XHSPRMO-TDT in Morelia, Michoacán
 XHTMTU-TDT in Tulum, Quintana Roo
 XHTMVE-TDT in Xalapa, Veracruz
 XHTOL-TDT on Jocotitlán, State of Mexico
 XHWX-TDT in Monterrey, Nuevo León
 XHZAT-TDT in Zacatecas, Zacatecas

19